André Corriveau may refer to:

 André Corriveau (filmmaker), Canadian filmmaker
 André Corriveau (ice hockey) (1928–1993), Canadian ice hockey player

See also
Corriveau (surname)